Karl Friedrich Müchler (born 2 September 1763 in Stargard in Pommern – died 12 January 1857 in Berlin) was a German writer.

Biography
Karl Friedrich Müchler was the son of educator and publicist . He studied law in Berlin and started a career in the Prussian justice system in 1785. In 1794 he was appointed as a war advisor. 

After Prussia's defeat against Napoléon Bonaparte's forces in 1806, Müchler dedicated himself to writing. A convinced Prussian patriot, he wrote educative lyrical poetry and prose. He joined a Masonic Lodge in Berlin.

In 1814, Müchler became the marshal of the general government of Dresden. In the same year, he edited the periodical Das erwachte Europa. He wrote anecdotes, posies, and other educative comical content addressed to youth and women. From 1799 to 1804, he was the husband of author Karoline von Woltmann, née Stosch. 

Karl Friedrich Müchler died in 1857 aged 93. He was buried at the Luisenstadt Cemetery in Berlin. His grave has not been preserved. A private school in Dortmund was named after him (the Karl-Müchler-Schule).

Works
 Taschenbuch für alle deutsche Frauen, 1801
 Gedichte, niedergelegt auf dem Altar des Vaterlandes, 1813
 Sittenbilder in Fabeln und Erzählungen für die Jugend, 1829
 (Karl Friedrich Müchler): Anekdotenlexikon für Leser mit Geschmack. 2 vol., 1 supplement vol. Berlin: Siegismund Friedrich Hesse, 1784–85
 Kriminalgeschichten. Aus gerichtlichen Akten gezogen, afterword edited by Alexander Košenina, Hannover: Wehrhahn Verlag, 2011

References

Bibliography
 
 
 .
 .

External links

 

19th-century German writers
19th-century German male writers
German Freemasons
1763 births
1857 deaths
People from the Kingdom of Prussia
Burials in Germany